The Bidai were a tribe of Atakapa Indians from eastern Texas.

History

Their oral history says that the Bidai were the original people in their region.  Their central settlements were along Bedias Creek, but their territory ranged from the Brazos River to the Neches River. The first written record of the tribe was in 1691, by Spanish explorers who said they lived near the Hasinai. French explorer François Simars de Bellisle described them as agriculturalists in 1718 and 1720.

They had three distinct villages or bands in the 18th century. The Deadose were the northernmost band of Bidai, who broke off in the early 18th century. The 18th century population of Bidai is estimated to be 600 with 200 additional Deadoses.

In 1770, the band colluded with French settlers to sell guns to the Lipan Apaches, as all parties were enemies with the Spanish.

The Bidai suffered several epidemics during 1776-77, reducing their population by at least half. The survivors joined neighboring tribes, such as the Akokisas and Koasati. Some settled on the Brazos Indian Reservation in present-day Young County, Texas and were removed with the Caddo to Indian Territory. Those that remained formed a village twelve miles from Montgomery, Texas, growing corn and picking cotton for hire in the mid-19th century.

Andre Sjoberg published an ethnohistory of the Bidai in 1951.

Lifeways
The Bidai hunted, gathered, fished, grew maize, and bartered their surplus maize. They snared game and trapped them in cane pens. During the summer months, they lived along the coasts, but in winters they moved inland in which they lived in bearskin tents.

Before contact, the Bidai made their own ceramics, but quickly adopted metal utensils from European trade. They still made ceramic pots into the 19th century, and they also wove a variety of baskets. In 1803, Dr. John Sibley wrote that Bidai had "an excellent character for honesty and punctuality."

The structure of their cradleboards altered the shape of their skulls. They also enhanced their appearance through body and facial tattooing.

Bidai medicine men were herbalists and performed sweatbathing. Patients could be treated by being raised scaffolds over smudge fires. While other Atakapan bands are known for their ritual cannibalism, the practice was never recorded among the Bidai.

Language

Bidai was a possible Atakapan language, which is now extinct. Below are some of the few Bidai words ever recorded.

Namah: one
Nahone: two
Naheestah: three
Nashirimah: four
Nahot nahonde: five
Nashees nahonde: six
Púskus: boy
Tándshai: corn

Name
Bidai has been spelled Biday, Bedies, Bidaises, Beadweyes, Bedies, Bedees, Bidias, Bedais, Midays, Vidais, Vidaes, Vidays. Their name could be Caddo, meaning "brushwood", and having reference to the Big Thicket near the lower Trinity River about which they lived. Their autonym was Quasmigdo.

Notes

References
 Sturtevant, William C., general editor and Raymond D. Fogelson, volume editor. Handbook of North American Indians: Southeast. Volume 14. Washington DC: Smithsonian Institution, 2004. .

External links
Bidai Indians, Texas State Historical Association
Bidai Indian History, Access Genealogy
 List of Native American peoples in the United States

Atakapa
Extinct Native American tribes
Indigenous peoples of the Southeastern Woodlands
Native American tribes in Texas
Native American history of Texas
Unclassified languages of North America